James Isaac (June 5, 1960 – May 6, 2012) was an American film director and visual effects supervisor.

Career

James Isaac was born June 5, 1960.

Isaac began work in film in the early 1980s creating the creatures in films such as Return of the Jedi and Gremlins. He continued his work into the 1980s with Enemy Mine, House II: The Second Story and DeepStar Six. He made his directorial debut on The Horror Show after the original director left the project a week into shooting.

He also worked with director David Cronenberg on his films The Fly, Naked Lunch and eXistenz. His other 1990s work included being a special effects supervisor for Chris Wales Inc. on Look Who's Talking Too and Virtuosity. He returned to directing in the 2000s, working on Jason X, Skinwalkers and Pig Hunt.

Isaac died of blood cancer on May 6, 2012.

Select filmography

References

Footnotes

Sources

External links

1960 births
2012 deaths
American film directors
Deaths from multiple myeloma
English-language film directors
Horror film directors